Davion Taylor (born August 5, 1998) is an American football linebacker  for the Philadelphia Eagles of the National Football League (NFL). He played college football at Colorado and was drafted by Eagles in the third round of the 2020 NFL Draft.

Early years
Taylor was raised in Magnolia, Mississippi by his Seventh-day Adventist mother Stephanie Taylor. Taylor attended South Pike High School but did not play high school football due to the religious beliefs of his church. He did play on the basketball team and ran track in high school.

College career
Taylor attended Coahoma Community College before attending the University of Colorado Boulder. After turning 18 he was given permission by his mother to join the football team. In 2018, Taylor transferred to Colorado. In 2018, he started 10 of 12 games, recording 57 tackles, one sack and one touchdown. As a senior in 2019, he started all 12 games, recording 72 tackles and one sack. Taylor also ran track at Coahoma and at Colorado.

Professional career

Taylor was drafted by the Philadelphia Eagles in the third round with the 103rd overall pick of the 2020 NFL Draft. He was placed on injured reserve on December 9, 2020. He was designated to return from injured reserve on December 30, and began practicing with the team again, but the team did not activate him before the end of the season.

Taylor took on a starting role with the team in Week 6 of the 2021 season, but was placed on injured reserve on November 24 due to a knee injury.

Taylor was released on August 31, 2022 and re-signed to the practice squad.

Statistics

Personal life
Taylor is a member of the Seventh-day Adventist Church.

References

External links
Colorado Buffaloes bio

1998 births
Living people
American football linebackers
American Seventh-day Adventists
Coahoma Tigers football players
Colorado Buffaloes football players
People from McComb, Mississippi
Philadelphia Eagles players
Players of American football from Mississippi